Chontal language may refer to:

in Oaxaca,
one of the Tequistlatecan languages
in Tabasco,
the Chontal Maya language